This is a partial list of individuals who have attended Columbia Law School. For a list of individuals who have attended or taught at Columbia University, see the list of Columbia University people.

Government

United States government

Executive branch

Presidents
 Franklin Delano Roosevelt (attended, fall 1904 to spring 1907)² (posthumous J.D., class of 1907), 32nd President of the United States (1933–45)
 Theodore Roosevelt (attended, 1880–81)² (posthumous J.D., class of 1882), 26th President of the United States (1901–09), hero of the Spanish–American War (Medal of Honor, posthumously awarded 2001), Nobel Peace Prize (1906)

Cabinet members and cabinet-level officers
 Bainbridge Colby (1891), United States Secretary of State (1920–21); founder of the Progressive Party (1912)
 Antony John 'Tony' Blinken (1988), United States Secretary of State in Biden Administration (2021–), National Security Advisor to Vice President Joseph Biden in the Administration of President Barack Obama (2009–17)
 Jacob M. Dickinson (attended), 44th United States Secretary of War (1909–11)
 James Rudolph Garfield (1888), United States Secretary of the Interior (1907–09), United States Civil Service Commission (1902–03)
 Eric Holder (1976), 82nd United States Attorney General, former Acting U.S. Attorney General, former U.S. Deputy Attorney General
 Charles Evans Hughes (1884), United States Secretary of State, professor of law at Cornell Law School, Governor of New York (1907), Associate Justice of the United States Supreme Court (1910–16), Republican nominee for President of the United States (1916-against Woodrow Wilson), and Chief Justice of the Supreme Court (1930–41)
 John Jay,¹ Acting United States Secretary of State (1789–90); Sixth President of the Continental Congress (1778–79); Second United States Secretary of Foreign Affairs (1784–89); Acting United States Secretary of Foreign Affairs (1789); co-author of The Federalist Papers
 Jeh Johnson, United States Secretary of Homeland Security (2013–)
 Franklin MacVeagh (1864), United States Secretary of the Treasury (1909–13)
 Joseph McKenna 42nd Attorney General of the United States (1897–98) (studied at Columbia Law while AG, before taking seat on U.S. Supreme Court)
 Frank Polk (1897), Acting United States Secretary of State (1920), Under Secretary of State (2nd ranking official in the U.S. Department of State) (1919–20)
 Oscar S. Straus (1873), United States Secretary of Commerce and Labor (1906–09), first Jewish Presidential Cabinet Secretary
 Russell E. Train (1948), 2nd Administrator, United States Environmental Protection Agency (EPA) (Cabinet level officer) (1973–77); Chairman, newly formed President's Council on Environmental Quality (1970–73); 1991 Presidential Medal of Freedom
 Frank Blake (1976), Deputy United States Secretary of Energy (2nd ranking official in the United States Department of Energy)
 J. Reuben Clark (1906), United States Under Secretary of State for President Calvin Coolidge (2nd ranking official in the U.S. Department of State from 1919 to 1972)
 Eric Hargan, Acting Deputy Secretary, United States Department of Health and Human Services (2nd ranking official in the Department) under President Donald Trump
 Harold M. Ickes, Deputy Chief of Staff in the Clinton administration
 George Lockhart Rives (B.A. 1868, LL.B.1873), United States Assistant Secretary of State (2nd ranking official in the U.S. Department of State from 1853 until 1913) (1887–89)
 John J. Sullivan (J.D. 1985), United States Deputy Secretary of Commerce (2nd ranking official in the U.S. Department of Commerce) (2008–09) under George W. Bush
 Harold R. Tyler, Jr. (1949), United States Deputy Attorney General (2nd ranking official in the U.S. Department of Justice) (1975–77)
 J. Mayhew Wainwright (1886), U.S. Assistant Secretary of War (2nd ranking official in the U.S. Department of War until 1940) (1921–23)
 Lawrence Edward Walsh (1935), United States Deputy Attorney General (2nd ranking official in the U.S. Department of Justice) (1957–60)

Directors of Central Intelligence
 William Colby (1947), Medal of Honor; 10th U.S. Director of Central Intelligence for the United States Central Intelligence Agency under Presidents Richard Nixon and Gerald Ford (1973–76)
 William Joseph Donovan (Law 1908), known as Father of the Central Intelligence Agency (CIA); founder and first director of the Office of Strategic Services (OSS) (formed during World War II, the predecessor of the CIA); U.S. Coordinator of Information (COI) under Franklin D. Roosevelt; also World War I hero, Medal of Honor; 1959 Freedom Award

White House Counsel
 Lanny A. Breuer (B.A. 1980, J.D. 1985), Special White House Counsel (1997–99) under Clinton; helped represent President Clinton during Independent Counsel and Congressional investigations and the impeachment hearings; Covington & Burling vice chair; former assistant Manhattan D.A. (1985–1989); U.S. Assistant A.G. for the Criminal Division (2009–2013) under Obama
 David B. Rivkin (J.D.), Legal Advisor to White House Counsel of then President Reagan; Deputy Director of the Office of Policy Development (OPD)
 Samuel Irving Rosenman (1919), first White House Counsel (1943–46) under Presidents Franklin D. Roosevelt and Harry S. Truman
 Charles Ruff (1963), White House Counsel under President Bill Clinton, defended President during impeachment trial in 1999
 Donald B. Verrilli, Jr. (J.D.), Deputy White House Counsel under President Barack Obama
 Trevor Morrison (1998), Associate White House Counsel to President Barack Obama (2009–10), professor of constitutional law at Columbia Law School
 Benjamin Powell (1996), Associate White House Counsel and Special Assistant to the President during administration of George W. Bush; General Counsel, Office of the Director of National Intelligence (General Counsel to the first three Directors of National Intelligence) (2006–09)

Presidential advisors
 Stephen Friedman (PFIAB) (1962), Director, President's United States National Economic Council under George W. Bush (2002–05), Chairman of the President's Foreign Intelligence Advisory Board (2005–09) (replacing Brent Scowcroft)
 Ulysses S. Grant, Jr., personal secretary to President Ulysses S. Grant
 Mark Barnes (LL.M. 1991), member, National Health Care Reform Task Force in the administration of President Bill Clinton
 John D. Clark (1907), member of President's Council of Economic Advisors (1946–53) under President Harry S Truman
 Jonathan W. Daniels (failed out of the Law School), White House Press Secretary under Presidents Franklin D. Roosevelt and Harry S. Truman
 Lynn Forester de Rothschild, United States Secretary of Energy Advisory Board under President Bill Clinton
 Ken Khachigian (J.D 1969), speechwriter for President Richard Nixon, Chief speechwriter for President Ronald Reagan
 John Marshall Kernochan, member of President John F. Kennedy's Commission on the Status of Women, which helped lead to women's rights legislation in the late 1960s
 Jay Lefkowitz (1987), Deputy Assistant to President George W. Bush for Domestic Policy
 Kathleen McGinty (J.D.)—Chair of the Council on Environmental Quality (1995–98)
 Brett H. McGurk (1999), United States National Security Council under President George W. Bush; Special Adviser-Iraq (2009–); Private militias in Iraq
 S. Jay Plager (LL.M. 1961), Associate Director, United States Office of Management and Budget (1987–88)
 Richard Stone, Vice Chairman of President Ronald Reagan's Commission for Radio Broadcasting to Cuba

Commissioners and agency heads, subcabinet members
 Nathan Feinsinger (Law, post-graduate study), Chairman, United States Wage Stabilization Board, named to the Board in 1951 by President Harry S. Truman
 William Dudley Foulke (1871), Commissioner, United States Civil Service Commission, which subsequently became the U.S. Office of Personnel Management (OPM) with some functions spun off to the U.S. Office of Special Counsel and the U.S. Equal Employment Opportunity Commission (EEOC)
 Harvey Goldschmid (1965), Commissioner (2002–05), and previously General Counsel, special adviser to the Chairman, United States Securities and Exchange Commission
 Henry Clay Hall (1883), twice Chairman (1917–18, 1924), Commissioner (1914–28), Interstate Commerce Commission
 John D. Hawke, Jr. (1960), United States Comptroller of the Currency (1998–2004) under Presidents Bill Clinton and George W. Bush; a director of the United States Federal Deposit Insurance Corporation, among other agencies (1998–2004); Under Secretary of the Treasury for Domestic Finance (1995–98)
 Edward Hidalgo (1936), Secretary of the Navy (1979–81); Assistant Secretary of the Navy (Manpower and Reserve Affairs) (1977–79)
 William Kovacic (1978), Chairman (2008–09), Commissioner (2006–09), Federal Trade Commission
 Craig E. Leen (2000), Director, Office of Federal Contract Compliance Programs (OFCCP), U.S. Department of Labor (2018–21)
 Irving Lewis "Scooter" Libby (1975), Chief of Staff, Vice President Dick Cheney (2001–05); convicted on obstruction of justice charges for his role in Plame affair (2007); novelist
 Charles E. F. Millard, Director, United States Pension Benefit Guaranty Corporation (2007–09)
 Annette Nazareth, Commissioner, United States Securities and Exchange Commission (2005–08)
 Robert Pitofsky, Chairman (1995–2001), Commissioner (1978–81), Federal Trade Commission
 Mary Jo White (1974), Chairman (2013–), Commissioner (2013–), United States Securities and Exchange Commission
 Carol A. DiBattiste (LL.M. 1986), former United States Under Secretary of the Air Force (2nd highest civilian official in the U.S. Department of the Air Force) (1999–2001)
 Tracy Voorhees (1915), Under Secretary of the United States Army (2nd ranking official in the U.S. Army) (1949–50)

Solicitors general
 Lloyd Wheaton Bowers, United States Solicitor General (1909–10)
 Charles Fried (1960), United States Solicitor General (1985–89), Acting United States Solicitor General, Deputy United States Solicitor General
 Daniel M. Friedman (1940), Acting United States Solicitor General (1977); First Deputy Solicitor General
 Stanley Foreman Reed, United States Solicitor General (1935–38)
 Donald Verrilli Jr. (1983), United States Solicitor General (2011–); White House Deputy Counsel to the President (2010–11)
 R. Kent Greenawalt (1963), Deputy United States Solicitor General (1971–72)

Judicial branch

Supreme Court
 Samuel Blatchford (1837)¹, Associate Justice of the Supreme Court (1882–93)
 Benjamin Nathan Cardozo (B.A.-CC, attended Law School for two years), Associate Justice of the Supreme Court (1932–38); judge, New York Court of Appeals (1914–32)
 William O. Douglas (1925), Associate Justice of the Supreme Court (1939–75); professor at Columbia Law and Yale Law School (1928–34), Chairman of the U.S. Securities and Exchange Commission (1936–39)
 Ruth Bader Ginsburg (1959), Associate Justice of the Supreme Court (1993–2020); professor at Rutgers Law (1963–72) and Columbia Law (1972–80); ACLU attorney (1972–80); judge, United States Court of Appeals for the District of Columbia Circuit (1980–93)
 Charles Evans Hughes (1884), Chief Justice of the United States (1930–41); Associate Justice of the Supreme Court (1910–16); Secretary of State (1921–29); Governor of New York (1907); Republican nominee for President of the United States (1916)
 John Jay (1764)¹, First Chief Justice of the United States (1789–95)
 Stanley Forman Reed, Associate Justice of the Supreme Court (1938–57); United States Solicitor General (1935–38)
 Harlan Fiske Stone (1898), Chief Justice of the United States (1941–46); Associate Justice of the Supreme Court (1925–41); Attorney General (1924–25); professor (1902–05) and dean (1910–23) at Columbia Law School
 Joseph McKenna (studied at the law school), Associate Justice of the Supreme Court (1892–97)

Court of Appeals
 Joseph F. Bianco (1991), United States Court of Appeals for the Second Circuit (2019–); United States District Court for the Eastern District of New York (2005–19)
 Samuel Blatchford, former United States Court of Appeals for the Second Circuit, United States District Court for the Southern District of New York
 Hugh H. Bownes (1948), United States Court of Appeals for the First Circuit (1977–2003), United States District Court for the District of New Hampshire (1968–77)
 LeBaron Bradford Colt (1870), United States Court of Appeals for the First Circuit (1891–13); United States Circuit Court (1894–91); United States District Court for the District of Rhode Island (1881–84)
 Kyle Duncan (LL.M. 2004), United States Court of Appeals for the Fifth Circuit (2018–)
 James Alger Fee (1914), United States Court of Appeals for the Ninth Circuit (1954–59), United States District Court for the District of Oregon (1931–54)
 Wilfred Feinberg (1946), United States Court of Appeals for the Second Circuit
 Daniel M. Friedman (1940), United States Court of Appeals for the Federal Circuit (1982–2011); Chief judge, United States Court of Claims (1978–82)
 John Patrick Hartigan (A.M., LL.B.), United States Court of Appeals for the First Circuit (1951–68), United States District Court for the District of Rhode Island (1940–51)
 Paul Raymond Hays, United States Court of Appeals for the Second Circuit (1961–80)
 Emile Henry Lacombe (1865), United States Court of Appeals for the Second Circuit (1887–1916)
 Barbara Lagoa (1992), United States Court of Appeals for the Eleventh Circuit (2019–); favored Supreme Court nominee to replace Ruth Bader Ginsburg
 Gerard E. Lynch (1975), U.S. Court of Appeals for the Second Circuit (2009–); U.S. District Court for the Southern District of New York (2000–09); professor, Columbia (1977–)
 J. Daniel Mahoney (1955), United States Court of Appeals for the Second Circuit (1986–96)
 Martin Manton (1901), United States Court of Appeals for the Second Circuit (1918–39), United States District Court for the Southern District of New York (1916–18)
 Julius Marshuetz Mayer, United States Court of Appeals for the Second Circuit (1921–24); United States District Court for the Southern District of New York (1912–21)
 Harold Medina (1912), former United States Court of Appeals for the Second Circuit; United States District Court for the Southern District of New York; cover of Time magazine, October 24, 1949; noted for hearing landmark cases of conspiracy and treason; professor of law at Columbia Law; lawyer
 Jack Miller (politician) (1946), former United States Court of Appeals for the Federal Circuit, United States Court of Customs and Patent Appeals
 Leonard P. Moore, United States Court of Appeals for the Second Circuit (1957–82)
 Harold Leventhal (judge) (1936), United States Court of Appeals for the District of Columbia Circuit (1965–79)
 S. Jay Plager (LL.M. 1961), United States Court of Appeals for the Federal Circuit
 Myrna Perez (2003), United States Court of Appeals for the Second Circuit 
Giles Sutherland Rich (1929), former United States Court of Appeals for the Federal Circuit, United States Court of Customs and Patent Appeals; co-author, Patent Act of 1952
 Robert D. Sack (1963), United States Court of Appeals for the Second Circuit
 James Marshall Sprouse (1949), United States Court of Appeals for the Fourth Circuit (1979–92; senior status 1992–95)
 Richard Wilde Walker, Jr. (attended), United States Court of Appeals for the Fifth Circuit (1914–36)
 Jerre Stockton Williams (1941), United States Court of Appeals for the Fifth Circuit (1980–93)
 Peter Woodbury, Chief judge (1959–64) and judge (1941–59), United States Court of Appeals for the First Circuit, senior status (1964–70)

U.S. District Court
 Charles L. Brieant 1949, United States District Court for the Southern District of New York (1971–2008)
 Frederick van Pelt Bryan (1928), United States District Court for the Southern District of New York (1956–78)
 Naomi Reice Buchwald (1968), United States District Court for the Southern District of New York (1999–)
 Robert L. Carter (1941), former United States District Court for the Southern District of New York
 Miriam Goldman Cedarbaum (1953), United States District Court for the Southern District of New York (1986–)
 Denise Cote (1975), United States District Court for the Southern District of New York (1994–)
 Archie Owen Dawson (1923), United States District Court for the Southern District of New York (1954–64)
 Marvin E. Frankel (1948), former United States District Court for the Southern District of New York (1965–78), professor at Columbia
 Lee Parsons Gagliardi (1947), United States District Court for the Southern District of New York (1971–98)
 Paul G. Gardephe (1982), United States District Court for the Southern District of New York (2009–)
 Gerard Louis Goettel (1955), United States District Court for the District of New York (1976–)
 Nathaniel M. Gorton, federal judge
 Alvin Hellerstein (1958), United States District Court for the Southern District of New York (1998–)
 William Bernard Herlands (1928), United States District Court for the Southern District of New York (1959–69)
 George Chandler Holt (1869), United States District Court for the Southern District of New York (1903–14)
 Richard J. Holwell (1970), United States District Court for the Southern District of New York (2003–)
 Kenneth M. Karas (1991), United States District Court for the Southern District of New York (2004–)
 Peter K. Leisure (attended), United States District Court for the Southern District of New York (1984–)
 Mary Johnson Lowe (LL.M. 1955), United States District Court for the Southern District of New York (1978–99)
 John S. Martin, Jr. (1961), United States District Court for the Southern District of New York (1990–2003)
 Charles Miller Metzner (1933), United States District Court for the Southern District of New York (1959–)
 Constance Baker Motley (1946), first African American woman appointed to federal bench (1966–86); attorney for the NAACP ('45–64); Manhattan Borough President ('64–66)
 Edmund Louis Palmieri (1929), United States District Court for the Southern District of New York (1954–89; senior status, 1972–89)
 Robert P. Patterson, Jr. (1950), United States District Court for the Southern District of New York (1988–)
 Milton Pollack (A.M., LL.M.), United States District Court for the Southern District of New York (1967–2004)
 Simon H. Rifkind (1925), United States District Court for the Southern District of New York (1941–50)
 Analisa Torres (1984), nominee, United States District Court for the Southern District of New York (2012–)
 Charles H. Tuttle (1902), United States District Court for the Southern District of New York (1927–30)
 Harold R. Tyler, Jr. (1949), United States District Court for the Southern District of New York (1962–75)
 Lawrence Edward Walsh (1935), United States District Court for the Southern District of New York (1954–57)
 Francis A. Winslow, United States District Court for the Southern District of New York (1927–29)
 John M. Woolsey, United States District Court for the Southern District of New York (1929–43)
 Mortimer W. Byers (1898), United States District Court for the Eastern District of New York (1929–62)
 Thomas Chatfield (1896), United States District Court for the Eastern District of New York (1907–25)
 Nicholas Garaufis (1974), United States District Court for the Eastern District of New York (2000–)
 Dora L. Irizarry (1979), United States District Court for the Eastern District of New York (2003–)
 Charles Proctor Sifton (1961), United States District Court for the Eastern District of New York (1977–2009)
 Jack B. Weinstein (1948), United States District Court for the Eastern District of New York (1967–present), professor at Columbia (1952–98)
 Joseph Carmine Zavatt (1924), United States District Court for the Eastern District of New York (1957–77)
 U. W. Clemon (1968), United States District Court for the Northern District of Alabama (1980–2009), Chief Judge(1999–2006)
 Lawrence K. Karlton (1958), United States District Court for the Eastern District of California; Chief judge (1983–90), Judge (1979–), senior status (2000–) 
 Richard G. Seeborg, United States District Court for the Northern District of California (2009–)
 John Foster Symes (1903), United States District Court for the District of Colorado (1922–51) 
 Alexander Holtzoff (1911), United States District Court for the District of Columbia (1945–67)
 Richard W. Roberts (1978), United States District Court for the District of Columbia (1998–)
 Beryl A. Howell (1983), nominee, United States District Court for the District of Columbia (2010)
 Alexander Harvey II (1950), United States District Court for the District of Maryland (1966–)
 Nathaniel M. Gorton (1966), United States District Court for the District of Massachusetts (1992–)
 Denise Page Hood (1977), United States District Court for the Eastern District of Michigan
 Joseph Cross, United States District Court for the District of New Jersey (1905–13)
 Dickinson Richards Debevoise (1951), United States District Court for the District of New Jersey (1979–)
 Walter Herbert Rice (JD/MBA 1962), United States District Court for the Southern District of Ohio; Chief Judge (1996–2003), judge (1980–), senior status (2004–)
 Anita B. Brody (1958), United States District Court for the Eastern District of Pennsylvania (1992–)
 Ira Lloyd Letts (1917), United States District Court for the District of Rhode Island (1928–35)
 Harry B. Anderson (1904), United States District Court for the Western District of Tennessee (1926–35)
 Lynn Adelman (1965), United States District Court for the Eastern District of Wisconsin (1997–)
 James Edward Doyle (1940), United States District Court for the Western District of Wisconsin (1965–87); Chief judge (1978–80)

Other federal courts
 Robert Gerber (1970), United States Bankruptcy Court for the Southern District of New York, presiding over 2009 General Motors bankruptcy and other major bankruptcies
 Timothy M. Reif (1985), United States Court of International Trade (2019–)
 Russell E. Train (1948), former United States Tax Court (1957–65)
 Sumner L. Trussell, judge of the United States Board of Tax Appeals
 Norman H. Wolfe (1953), Special Trial Judge in the United States Tax Court (1985–?)
 Vanzetta Penn McPherson (1974), United States Magistrate Judge, Middle District of Alabama (1992–2006)

Legislative branch

Senators
 Alva B. Adams (1899), United States Senator from Colorado (1923–24, 1933–41)
 Johnson N. Camden Jr., senator from Kentucky (1914–15)
 Clifford P. Case (1928), senator (1955–79) from New Jersey
 LeBaron B. Colt (1870), senator from Rhode Island (1913–24)
 Slade Gorton (1953), senator from Washington (1981–87;1989–2001)
 Frederick Hale (1896–97), senator from Maine (1917–41)
 Lister Hill (left 1915), senator (1938–69) from Alabama
 John Kean (1875), senator from New Jersey (1899–1911)
 Richard C. Hunter (1911), senator from Nebraska (1934–35)
 Luke Lea (1903), senator from Tennessee (1911–17)
 Thomas E. Martin (LL.M. 1928), senator (1955–61) from Iowa
 Jack Miller (politician) (1946), senator from Iowa (1961–73)
 Dwight Morrow (1898?), senator from New Jersey (1930–31)
 Wayne Morse (S.J.D. 1932), senator from Oregon (1945–69)
 Frank C. Partridge (1864), senator from Vermont (1930–31)
 John Patton Jr. (1877), senator from Michigan (1894–95)
 Howard Alexander Smith (1908), senator from New Jersey (1944–59)
 Richard Stone (1954), senator from Florida (1975–80)
 Arthur Vivian Watkins, senator from New York (1947–59)
 George P. Wetmore (1869), senator from Rhode Island (1895–1907; 1908–13)
 Harrison A. Williams (1948), senator (1959–82) from New Jersey

Representatives
 Bella Abzug, congresswoman from New York (1971–77) and leader of the women's movement
 John J. Adams, congressman from New York (1883–85;1885–87)
 Homer D. Angell (1903), Congressman from Oregon (1939–55)
 Martin C. Ansorge (1906), congressman from New York (1921–23)
 Edward Basset (1886), congressman from New York (1903–05); founding father, modern urban planning; developed "freeway" and "parkway" concepts
 Perry Belmont (1876), congressman from New York (1880–88)
 Loring Black, congressman from New York (1923–35)
 Robert William Bonynge (1885), congressman from Colorado (1904–09)
 Frank T. Bow, congressman from Ohio (1951–72)
 Lloyd Bryce, congressman from New York (1887–89)
 John F. Carew (B.A. 1893, LL.M. 1896), congressman from New York (1913–29)
 Clifford P. Case (1928), congressman (1945–53) and senator (1955–79) from New Jersey
 Emanuel Celler (1912), congressman from New York (1923–73)
 Alexander Gilmore Cochran, congressman from Pennsylvania (1875–77)
 Frederic René Coudert, Jr. (1922), congressman from New York (1947–59)
 Robert Crosser (transferred), congressman from Ohio (1913–19, 1923–55)
 Colgate Darden (1923), congressman from Virginia (1933–37, 1939–41), Governor of Virginia (1942–46), chancellor of the College of William and Mary (1946–47), president of the University of Virginia (1947–59); namesake of the Darden Graduate School of Business Administration
 Philip Henry Dugro (1878), congressman from New York (1881–83)
 Charles T. Dunwell (1874), congressman from New York (1903–08)
 Sidney A. Fine (1926), congressman from New York (1951–56)
 Hamilton Fish II (1873), congressman from New York (1909–11)
 Ashbel P. Fitch, congressman from New York (1887–93)
 Frank T. Fitzgerald (1876), congressman from New York (1889)
 Wallace T. Foote, Jr., congressman from New York (1895–99)
 George E. Foss (attended), congressman from Illinois (1895–1913; 1915–19)
 Samuel Fowler unspecified, represented New Jersey's 4th congressional district as the U.S. representative from 1889 to 1893. Built and operated Cape Cod Canal
 Jaime Fuster (LL.M. 1966), U.S. representative from Puerto Rico's at large district (1985–92)
 Ralph A. Gamble (1912), congressman from New York (1937–45; 1945–53; 1953–57)
 Fred Benjamin Gernerd (1924), congressman from Pennsylvania (1921–23)
 James R. Grover, Jr. (1949), congressman from New York (1963–75)
 Ralph W. Gwinn (1908), congressman from New York (1945–59)
 Thomas Hedge (1869), congressman from Iowa (1899–1907)
 Lewis Henry (1911), congressman from New York (1922–23)
 Lister Hill (left 1915), congressman (1923–38) and senator (1938–69) from Alabama
 Theodore Gaillard Hunt, congressman from Louisiana (1853–55)
 Hamilton C. Jones (1907), congressman from North Carolina (1947–53)
 John Kean (1875), senator and congressman from New Jersey (1899–1911)
 Theodore R. Kupferman, congressman from New York (1966–69)
 George P. Lawrence, congressman from Massachusetts (1898–1913)
 John J. Lentz (1883), congressman from Ohio (1897–1901)
 Montague Lessler (1889), congressman from New York (1902–03)
 Marcus C. Lisle, congressman from Kentucky (1893–94)
 Washington J. McCormick (1910), congressman from Montana (1921–23)
 John McKeon (1828), congressman from New York (1835–37, 1841–43)
 Roy H. McVicker (1950), congressman from Colorado (1965–67)
 Thomas E. Martin (LL.M. 1928), senator (1955–61), congressman (1939–55) from Iowa
 Mitchell May (LL.M. 1892) congressman from New York (1899–1901)
 Schuyler Merritt (1876), congressman from Connecticut (1917–31; 1933–37)
 Brad Miller (congressman) (1979), congressman from North Carolina (2003–13)
 J. Van Vechten Olcott (1877), congressman from New York (1905–11)
 William Claiborne Owens (1872), congressman from Kentucky (1895–97)
 Richard W. Parker (1869), congressman from New Jersey (1895–1903; 1903–11; 1914–19; 1921–23)
 Thomas G. Patten (1880–82), congressman from New York (1911–17)
 William Walter Phelps (1863), congressman from New Jersey (1873–75; 1883–89)
 Philip J. Philbin (1929), congressman from Massachusetts (1943–76)
 Otis G. Pike (1948), congressman from New York (1961–79)
 Henry Jarvis Raymond (1871), congressman from New York (1865–67); Lieutenant Governor of New York (1854–56); founder of The New York Times
 Edward Everett Robbins (1884), congressman from Pennsylvania (1897–99; 1917–19)
 William Fitts Ryan (1949), congressman from New York (1961–72)
 James Scheuer (1948), congressman from New York (1965–93)
 Townsend Scudder (1888), congressman from New York (1899–1901; 1903–05)
 John F. Seiberling (1949), congressman from Ohio (1971–87)
 Eugene Siler (attended), congressman from Kentucky (1955–63, 1963–65)
 Percy Hamilton Stewart (1893), congressman from New Jersey (1931–33)
 Jessie Sumner (studied at the Law School), congresswoman from Illinois (1939–47)
 Edward Swann (1886), congressman from New York (in 57th U.S. Congress); New York County District Attorney (1916–21)
 James W. Symington (1954), congressman from Missouri (1969–77)
 Charles Phelps Taft (1864), congressman from Ohio (1895–97); editor of the Cincinnati Times-Star; owner, Chicago Cubs (1914–16)
 Benjamin I. Taylor (1899), congressman from New York (1913–15)
 John A. Thayer, congressman from Massachusetts (1911–13)
 J. Mayhew Wainwright (1886), congressman from New York (1923–31)
 William C. Wallace (1876), congressman from New York (1889–91)
 Charles Weltner (1950), congressman from Georgia (1963–67), John F. Kennedy Profile in Courage Award
 Harrison A. Williams (1948), congressman (1953–57) and senator (1959–82) from New Jersey
 Francis H. Wilson (1875), congressman from New York (1895–97)
 Herbert Zelenko (1928), congressman from New York (1955–63)

Other Legislative Branch Officials
 Herbert Putnam (1884), Librarian of Congress

United States diplomats
 Anthony Luzzatto Gardner, U.S. Ambassador to the European Union (present)
 William Waldorf Astor, 1st Viscount Astor, U.S. Minister to Italy, statesman, philanthropist
 Perry Belmont (1876), U.S. Ambassador to Spain (1888–89); congressman from New York (1880–88)
 Lloyd Bryce, U.S. Minister plenipotentiary to the Netherlands (1911–13)
 Charles Chaille-Long, U.S. Consul General and Secretary to delegation in Korea; soldier, explorer
 Reuben Clark, United States Ambassador to Mexico (1930–33)
 William Joseph Donovan (1905), U.S. Ambassador to Thailand (1953–54), World War I hero, head of the OSS during World War II
 Abram Isaac Elkus, appointed by Woodrow Wilson to be the United States Ambassador to the Ottoman Empire in Constantinople (1916–17)
 Makila James, nominee, U.S. Ambassador to the Kingdom of Swaziland (2012–)
 John Jay (1764), helped to fashion American foreign policy, U.S. Minister (ambassador) to Spain and France; the Jay Treaty
 Hallett Johnson (1912), ambassador to Costa Rica
 Jay Lefkowitz, President George W. Bush's Special Envoy for Human Rights in North Korea
 Charles MacVeagh (1883), U.S. Ambassador to Japan (1925–28)
 Brett H. McGurk (1999), nominee, U.S. Ambassador to the Republic of Iraq (2012–)
 David E. Mark, U.S. Ambassador to Burundi (1974–77); career Minister, serving in South Korea, Germany, Moscow; helped Georgians write their Constitution
 Vilma Socorro Martínez, first woman to serve as United States Ambassador to Argentina (2009–)
 Henry Morgenthau, Sr., U.S. Ambassador to the Ottoman Empire (1913–16)
 Dwight Morrow (1898?), U.S. Ambassador to Mexico (1927–30)
 Covey T. Oliver (S.J.D. 1953), United States Ambassador to Colombia (1964–66)
 Frank C. Partridge (LL.B. 1884), United States Minister to Venezuela (1893–94), consul general at Tangier, Morocco (1897–98)
 William Walter Phelps (1863), U.S. Ambassador to Austria-Hungary (1881–82), Germany (1889–93)
 Frank Polk (1897), Headed American Commission to Negotiate Peace (1919)
 Stephen Rapp, United States Ambassador-at-Large for War Crimes Issues in the Office of Global Criminal Justice (2009–)
 Mitchell Reiss, former Director of Policy Planning at U.S. State Department under Secretary Colin Powell (2003–05); U.S. Special Envoy to Ireland with diplomatic rank of Ambassador (stepped down in 2007); Chief negotiator for the United States in the Korean Peninsula Energy Development Organization
 Julissa Reynoso (2001), United States Ambassador to Uruguay (2011–)
 John Wallace Riddle (1890), U.S. Ambassador to Russia (1907–09); Argentina (1922–25)
 Eugene Schuyler (1863), first American diplomat to visit Central Asia, first U.S. Minister to Romania and Serbia, also U.S. Minister to Greece
 David S. Smith, U.S. Ambassador to Sweden (1976–77)
 Laurence A. Steinhardt (LL.B. 1915), U.S. Ambassador to the Soviet Union (1939–41); U.S. Ambassador to Turkey (1942–45); U.S. Ambassador to Czechoslovakia (1945–48); U.S. Ambassador to Sweden (1933–37); U.S. Ambassador to Peru (1937–39); U.S. Ambassador to Canada (1948–50)
 Oscar S. Straus (1873), thrice U.S. Ambassador to the Ottoman Empire (1909–10; 1898–99; 1887–89)
 Tracy Voorhees (1915), the U.S. President's Personal Representative for Cuban Refugees (1960–61) in the administration of President John F. Kennedy
 Edward T. Wailes (1927), U.S. Ambassador to Iran (1958–61), Czechoslovakia (1961–62), Hungary (1956–57), South Africa
 Lawrence Edward Walsh (1935), Ambassador, U.S. Delegation, Paris Peace Talks (1969)
 Paul Warnke (1948), Chief SALT Negotiator under President Jimmy Carter and Director of the Arms Control and Disarmament Agency (1976–78), helped negotiate the unratified SALT II agreement with the former Soviet Union
 H. Walter Webb, U.S. Ambassador to Brazil
 Nugroho Wisnumurti—(J.D. 1973) President, United Nations Security Council (August 1995 and November 1996); Ambassador/Permanent Representative of the Republic of Indonesia to the United Nations (1992–97); Indonesia's Permanent Representative to the United Nations and Other Organizations in Geneva (2000–04);

Military
 William Joseph Donovan (Wild Bill)—(LL.B.) World War I, World War II hero; only person to receive Medal of Honor, Distinguished Service Cross, Distinguished Service Medal (3), and National Security Medal; also recipient of Silver Star, Purple Heart (2), and IRC's Freedom Award
 Ira C. Eaker—(studied law) Congressional Gold Medal; four-star general, United States Army Air Forces during World War II; architect, strategic bombing force
 Benjamin Kaplan—(LL.B. 1933) while a lieutenant colonel in U.S. Army during World War II, "one of the principal architects" of the Nuremberg trials
 Philip Kearny—(LL.B. 1833) Brigadier General, U.S. Army; notable for his leadership in the Mexican–American War and Civil War
 John Watts de Peyster—(studied law) Major general during the American Civil War; author on the art of war, one of the first military critics
 John Watts de Peyster, Jr.—(studied law) Brigadier General; Union Army officer during the American Civil War
 Rudolph Douglas Raiford—(J.D.) decorated African-American World War II combat officer who trained and commanded the Infantry Buffalo Division in Italy
 LaRue L. Robinson—(2009) African-American officer and trial lawyer in the Judge Advocate General's Corps, United States Army during the War on Terror; also Truman National Security Project Fellow who is cited in Terror and Consent
 Richard Whitehead Young (LL.B. 1884) Brigadier General; in Spanish–American War led Utah Light Artillery in Philippines; in World War I led a U.S. artillery brigade in France

Miscellaneous United States government
 Zainab Ahmad (2005), Assistant United States Attorney for the Eastern District of New York; member of the 2017 Special Counsel for the United States Department of Justice team
 David M. Becker (1973), General Counsel, Senior Policy Director, U.S. Securities and Exchange Commission (SEC) (2009–11); General Counsel, SEC (2000–02)
 Richard Ben-Veniste (1967), federal prosecutor (1968–73); Chief, Watergate Task Force of the Special Prosecutor's Office (1973–75); member, 9/11 Commission (2002–04)
 Moe Berg (1930), spy, Office of Strategic Services (OSS), able to speak 12 languages; light-hitting catcher, Brooklyn Robins (1923), Chicago White Sox (1926–30), Cleveland Indians (1931, 34), Washington Senators (1932–34) and Boston Red Sox (1935–39); according to Casey Stengel, "the strangest man ever to play Major League Baseball"
 Preet Bharara (1993), United States Attorney for the Southern District of New York (2009–); Time Magazine's 2012 "100 Most Influential People in the World"
 Frank Blake (1976), General Counsel, United States Environmental Protection Agency, Deputy Counsel to Vice-President George H. W. Bush
 Walker Blaine (1878), former official in the United States Department of State; Solicitor of the Department of State
 Lanny A. Breuer, head, Criminal Division, United States Department of Justice in administration of President Barack Obama
 Edward Bruce (New Deal) (1904), appointed by Franklin D. Roosevelt as Director of Public Works of Art Project and Section of Painting and Sculpture, New Deal projects
 George Canellos (1989), regional director, United States Securities and Exchange Commission's New York Office (2009–)
 Sheila C. Cheston (1984), former General Counsel, United States Air Force (1995–98)
 Tristram Coffin (1989), United States Attorney for the District of Vermont  (2009–)
 Roy Cohn (1947), anti-communist attorney; an influential aide to Senator Joseph McCarthy; active in espionage trial of Julius and Ethel Rosenberg
 Mathias F. Correa (1934), United States Attorney for the Southern District of New York (1941–43)
 William Joseph Donovan (1908), United States Attorney for the Western District of New York, World War I hero (Medal of Honor)
 Jose W. Fernandez, United States Assistant Secretary of State for Economic, Energy, and Business Affairs (2009–)
 Slade Gorton (1953), member, 9/11 Commission
 Eric Holder (1976), United States Attorney for the District of Columbia
 Bill Lann Lee (1974), Assistant Attorney General of the United States for Civil Rights (1997–2001)
 Russell Cornell Leffingwell (1902), Assistant United States Secretary of the Treasury; led (1944–53) and president (1944–46), Council of Foreign Relations
 Leonard P. Moore, United States Attorney for the Eastern District of New York (1953–57)
 Irvin B. Nathan, Attorney General of the District of Columbia, General Counsel of the United States House of Representatives
 Rudolph Douglas Raiford, first African American Chief of Labor Relations, United States Department of Housing and Urban Development
 Barbara Ringer (1949), first female Register of Copyrights, United States Copyright Office (1973–80); key contributor to preparation and passage of Copyright Act of 1976
 George L. Rives (B.A. 1868, LL.M. 1873), United States Assistant Secretary of State (1887–89)
 Benito Romano (J.D. 1976), first Puerto Rican to serve as United States Attorney for the Southern District of New York (on an interim basis)
 Charles Ruff (1963), United States Attorney for the District of Columbia; in Watergate scandal, Special Prosecutor who investigated President Richard Nixon; represented Anita Hill during the Clarence Thomas Supreme Court nomination and confirmation hearings in the Senate; defended President Bill Clinton in the 1999 impeachment proceedings
 Richard G. Seeborg, United States Attorney for the Northern District of California (1991–98)
 Whitney North Seymour (1923), Assistant United States Solicitor General (1931–33)
 Andrew J. Shapiro (1994), Assistant Secretary of State for Political-Military Affairs, United States Department of State (2009–); senior adviser, Secretary of State Hillary Clinton
 Charles H. Tuttle—(LL.B. 1902) United States Attorney for the Southern District of New York (1927–30)
 Donald Verrilli (1983), Associate Deputy Attorney General of the United States in the administration of President Barack Obama (2009–11)
 David Vladeck (1976), Director of the Bureau of Consumer Protection, Federal Trade Commission (2009–)
 Lawrence E. Walsh (1935), Independent Prosecutor for the Iran-Contra Affair, Trustee of Columbia University
 Paul Warnke, Assistant Secretary of Defense, International Security Affairs (1967–69); General Counsel, United States Secretary of Defense under President Lyndon Johnson
 Charles Warren (U.S. author) (S.J.D. 1933), Assistant Attorney General of the United States (1914–18), drafted Espionage Act of 1917
 Mary Jo White (1974), first female United States Attorney for the Southern District of New York (1993–2002)
 Edward Baldwin Whitney, Assistant Attorney General of the United States

State government

Governors
 Steve Bullock (1994), 24th Governor of Montana (2013–); Attorney General of Montana (2009–13)
 Doyle E. Carlton (1902), 25th Governor of Florida (1929–33)
 Colgate Darden (1923), 54th Governor of Virginia (1942–46), U.S. congressman from Virginia (1933–37, 1939–41); chancellor, College of William and Mary (1946–47); president, University of Virginia (1947–59); namesake of the Darden Graduate School of Business Administration
 Gray Davis (1967), 37th Governor of California (1999–2003), Lieutenant Governor (1995–99) California State Controller (1987–95)
 Westmoreland Davis (1886), 48th Governor of Virginia (1918–22)
 Thomas E. Dewey (1925), 47th Governor of New York (1942–55), Manhattan District Attorney (1937–42), and Republican nominee for President of the United States (1944, 1948), name partner of New York law firm Dewey Ballantine
 Horace F. Graham, 56th Governor of Vermont (1917–19)
 Charles Evans Hughes (1884), 36th Governor of New York (1907); professor, Cornell Law School, Associate Justice of the Supreme Court (1910–16), Republican nominee for President of the United States (1916), United States Secretary of State (1921–29), and Chief Justice of the Supreme Court (1930–41)
 John Jay (1764), second Governor of New York
 Ruby Laffoon (attended), 43rd Governor of Kentucky (1931–35)
 John W. King (1943), 71st Governor of New Hampshire (1963–69)
 Robert Baumle Meyner (1933), 44th Governor of New Jersey (1952–62)
 George Pataki (1970), 63rd Governor of New York (1994–2006)
 George P. Wetmore (1869), 37th Governor of Rhode Island
 Horace White (attended), 37th Governor of New York and Lieutenant Governor

State Attorneys General
 Dean Alfange (1925), Deputy New York State Attorney General; founding member of the Liberal Party of New York
 Daniel P. Baldwin (1860), Indiana Attorney General (1880-1882)
 Margery Bronster (1982), Hawaii Attorney General (1995–99)
 Steve Bullock (1994), Attorney General of Montana (2009–13)
 Samuel P. Colt (1876), Attorney General of Rhode Island (1882–?)
 Herbert F. DeSimone (1954), Attorney General of Rhode Island and Assistant Secretary of Transportation 
 Slade Gorton (1953), Washington Attorney General (1969–81), former U.S. Senator from Washington
 Theodore E. Hancock (1873), New York State Attorney General (1894–98)
 Peter C. Harvey (1982), first African American to serve as Attorney General of New Jersey (2003–06)
 Richard C. Hunter (1911), Attorney General of Nebraska (1937–39), former U.S. Senator from Nebraska
 Julius Marshuetz Mayer, New York State Attorney General (1905–06)
 Robert H. McCarter (1882), Attorney General of New Jersey (1903–08)
 Thomas N. McCarter, Attorney General of New Jersey (1902–03)
 John T. McDonough (1861), New York State Attorney General (1899–1902)
 Richard M. Milburn, Attorney General of Indiana (January 1915-November 1915)
 Irvin B. Nathan (1967), former Attorney General of the District of Columbia; former General Counsel, United States House of Representatives; Abscam lawyer for House
 Edmund Wilson, Sr., Attorney General of New Jersey (1908–14)

State judges, politicians and others
 Sheila Abdus-Salaam (1977), judge, New York Court of Appeals (the highest court in the State of New York) (2013–), first African American woman on Court; Justice, Appellate Division of the Supreme Court, First Judicial Department (2009–)
 William Shankland Andrews (1882), judge, New York Court of Appeals (1917–28), where he dissented from several opinions by noted fellow judge and Columbia Law graduate Benjamin Cardozo
 Charles D. Breitel, Chief Judge, New York Court of Appeals (1974–78)
 Benjamin Cardozo (1889–91), Chief Judge and judge New York Court of Appeals; Associate Justice, U.S. Supreme Court; namesake of Benjamin N. Cardozo School of Law
 William N. Cohen (1881), Justice, New York Supreme Court
 Frederick E. Crane, former Chief Judge and judge, New York Court of Appeals
 Justin Fairfax (2005), 41st Lieutenant Governor of Virginia
 Edward R. Finch (1898), former judge, New York Court of Appeals
 Ralph Adam Fine, judge, Wisconsin Court of Appeals (1988–)
 James Greeley Flanders (1869), former member of the Wisconsin State Assembly
 Charles Fried, Associate Justice of the Massachusetts Supreme Judicial Court (the highest court in the Commonwealth of Massachusetts)
 Stanley Fuld (1926), former Chief Judge and judge, New York Court of Appeals
John Manning Hall (1868), speaker of the Connecticut House of Representatives (1882), president pro tempore of the Connecticut State Senate (1889), and Connecticut Superior Court judge (1889–1893)
 William B. Hornblower (1875), former judge, New York Court of Appeals
 Roderick L. Ireland (1969), Chief Justice, (2010–), Associate Justice (1997–10), Massachusetts Supreme Judicial Court; 1st African-American Chief Justice, Massachusetts high court
 Benjamin Kaplan, Associate Justice of the Massachusetts Supreme Judicial Court (1972–8) and later on the Massachusetts Appeals Court.
 Frank S. Katzenbach, Associate Justice of the New Jersey Supreme Court (the highest court in the State of New Jersey)
 Edward Kent, Jr. (1887), the final Chief Justice of the Arizona Territorial Supreme Court
 Walter M. D. Kern (1962), politician who served in the New Jersey General Assembly from 1978 to 1990, where he represented the 40th Legislative District.
 Randall B. Kester (1940), Associate Justice of the Oregon Supreme Court (the highest court in the state of Oregon) (1957–58)
 John King, Chief Justice (1981–86)and Justice (1979–81), New Hampshire Supreme Court (the highest court in the State of New Hampshire)
 Charles J. Kurth (1862–1896), lawyer and member of the New York State Assembly
 Irving Lehman (1897), former Chief Judge and judge, New York Court of Appeals
 George Z. Medalie (1907), former judge, New York Court of Appeals
 Lindsey Miller-Lerman (1973), Justice, Nebraska Supreme Court (the highest Court in the State of Nebraska) (1998–), former judge, Nebraska State Court of Appeals
 Flemming L. Norcott, Jr. (B.A. 1965, J.D. 1968), Associate Justice, Connecticut Supreme Court (1992–); Associate Fellow, Calhoun College, Yale University
 James E.C. Perry (1972), Justice of the Florida Supreme Court (the highest court in the State of Florida) (2009–)
 Jennifer Rivera (LL.M. 1993), judge, New York Court of Appeals (2013–)
 Thomas G. Saylor (1972), Justice of the Supreme Court of Pennsylvania (the highest court in the State of Pennsylvania) (1997–)
 Calvert Spensley (1869), member of the Wisconsin State Senate (1893–96)
 Aron Steuer (LL.B. 1923), Justice of the New York State Supreme Court, Appellate Division, First Department
 Theodore L. Stiles (1872), was one of the first Justices of the Washington Supreme Court (the highest court in the State of Washington) (1889–95)
 Robert S. Smith (1968), judge, New York Court of Appeals (2003–)
 Arthur T. Vanderbilt, Chief Justice, New Jersey Supreme Court (1948–57)
 Richard Wilde Walker, Jr. (attended), Associate Justice of the Alabama Supreme Court (the highest court in the State of Alabama) (1914–36)
 John Webb (jurist), Associate Justice of the North Carolina Supreme Court (the highest court in the state in State of North Carolina) (1986–98)
 Charles Weltner (1950), Chief Justice of the Supreme Court of Georgia (the highest court in the U.S. state of Georgia) (1981–92)
 Robert Wilentz, Chief Justice of the New Jersey Supreme Court (1979–96)
 Peter Woodbury, Associate Justice of the New Hampshire Supreme Court (the highest court in the State of New Hampshire) (1933–41)
 Rolando T. Acosta (1982), Justice of the Appellate Division of the Supreme Court, First Judicial Department (2008–)
 Richard Andrias (1970), Justice of the Appellate Division of the Supreme Court, First Judicial Department (2008–)
 Matthew Boxer, the first New Jersey State Comptroller.
 Albert Burstein, member of the New Jersey General Assembly.
 Lewis Stuyvesant Chanler (LL.B. 1891), Lieutenant Governor of New York (1907–08)
 John Watts de Peyster (studied at the Law School), Brevet Major General in the New York Militia
 John Watts de Peyster, Jr. (studied at the Law School) Brevet Brigadier General in the New York Militia
 Hamilton Fish II (1873), Speaker of the New York State Assembly (1895–96)
 Luis A. Gonzalez (1975), Presiding Justice of the Appellate Division of the Supreme Court, First Judicial Department (2009–), Justice (2002–09)
 Priscilla Hall (1973), Justice of the New York Supreme Court, Appellate Division, Second Judicial Department (2009–)
 George Landon Ingraham (1869), Presiding Justice of the Appellate Division of the Supreme Court, First Judicial Department (1910–15), Justice (1896–1910)
 Almet Francis Jenks (1877), Presiding Justice of the Appellate Division of the Supreme Court, Second Judicial Department (1911–12, 1912–21), Justice (1905–11)
 Steve Kelley, former Minnesota state senator, Minnesota House of Representatives, currently Director of the Center for Science, Technology, and Public Policy at the Humphrey Institute of Public Affairs at the University of Minnesota
 Rory Lancman, member of the New York City Council, representing the 24th Council District since 2014. Former member of the New York State Assembly.
 Benjamin M. Lawsky (B.A., J.D.), first Superintendent, New York State Department of Financial Services (2011–); investigated Standard Chartered
 Edward Lazansky (B.A. 1985, J.D. 1897), Justice of the New York Supreme Court, Appellate Division (1926–43); Secretary of State of New York (1911–12)
 Ben McAdams (2003), rising Utah state senator
 Angela Mazzarelli (1971), Justice of the Appellate Division of the Supreme Court, First Judicial Department (1994–)
 Karla Moskowitz (1966), Justice of the Appellate Division of the Supreme Court, First Judicial Department (2008–)
 Edgar J. Nathan (1916), Manhattan Borough President and Judge of the New York Supreme Court
 Charles J. O'Byrne (1984), Secretary to the Governor of New York David Paterson (2008)
 Eric T. Washington (1979), Chief judge (2005–), District of Columbia Court of Appeals (the highest court in the District of Columbia) (1999–)

City and county government
 Charles d'Autremont (1875), former mayor of Duluth, Minnesota
 Hugh H. Bownes (1948), former mayor of Laconia, New Hampshire
 Michael A. Cardozo (1966), corporation counsel of New York City (2002–present)
 Maurice E. Connolly, Borough president of Queens, New York, U.S.A. (1911–28)
Charles L. Craig (1872–1935), New York City Comptroller
 Rocky Delgadillo (1986), City Attorney of Los Angeles; first Latino in over 100 years to be elected citywide in Los Angeles
 Thomas Dewey (1925), former Manhattan District Attorney
 William Henry Eustis (1874), Mayor of Minneapolis (1893–95)
 Thomas Gulotta (1969) County Executive of Nassau County, New York (1987–2001)
 Hugh J. Grant, mayor of New York City (1889–92, two terms); remains youngest mayor in the city's history
 Rudolph Halley (1933), former President of the New York City Council
 Walter Foxcroft Hawkins (1886), former mayor of Pittsfield, the largest city and traditional county seat of Massachusetts' Berkshire County
 Frank S. Katzenbach, former mayor of Trenton, New Jersey; justice, New Jersey Supreme Court
 George Latimer (Minnesota politician), mayor of Saint Paul, Minnesota (1976–90); regent of the University of Minnesota
 Charles Meeker, mayor of Raleigh, North Carolina (2001–current)
 Constance Baker Motley (1946), first African American female, Manhattan Borough President (1964–66); attorney, NAACP Legal Defense and Educational Fund (1946–64)
 De Lancey Nicoll (1876) New York County District Attorney (1891–93)
 William M.K. Olcott, New York County District Attorney (1897–98)
 George Pataki (1970), former mayor of Peekskill, New York; former governor of New York
 Eugene A. Philbin (1885), New York County District Attorney (1899–1901)
 Robert Price (attorney), Deputy Mayor of New York City under John Lindsay
 Louise Renne (1961), former mayor San Francisco (1978–86); first female City Attorney, City and County of San Francisco (1978–01)
 Janette Sadik-Khan, current Commissioner of the New York City Department of Transportation (2007–)
 Percy Hamilton Stewart (1893), former mayor of Plainfield, New Jersey
 Andrew H. Warren (2002), State Attorney of Florida's 13th Judicial Circuit, Hillsborough County (2017–22)
 Terence M. Zaleski, first strong-mayor of the city of Yonkers since World War II (1992–95)

Non-U.S. government

Prominent political figures
 William Pike Hall, Sr. (Class of 1922, 1896–1945), Louisiana state senator for Caddo and DeSoto parishes, 1924 to 1932, Shreveport attorney
 Giuliano Amato (LL.M. 1963), twice Prime Minister of Italy (2000–01; 1992–93), twice Italian Minister of Foreign Affairs (Secretary of State) (2001 and 1992), Minister of the Exchequer and Deputy Prime Minister (1987–89), Italian Minister of the Interior (2006–08), President of the Council of Ministers of Italy (2000–01; 1992–93), Minister for Institutional Reforms (1998–99), Minister of the Exchequer, Budget and Economic Programming (1999–2000), member of the Italian Senate (2001–06), member of the Italian Chamber of Deputies (2006–08; 1993–94), Vice President of the Convention on the Future of Europe (2001–03)
 Mikhail Saakashvili (LL.M. 1994), third President, Georgia (2005–present), former Minister of Justice
 Dionysia-Theodora Avgerinopoulou (J.S.D. 2011) member, Hellenic Parliament since the 2009 legislative election
 Radhika Coomaraswamy, appointed by United Nations Secretary-General Kofi Annan as Under Secretary-General, Special Representative, Children and Armed Conflict (2006)
 Kim Hyun-jong (J.D. 1985), former South Korean Minister for Trade (cabinet) in the administration of President Roh Moo-hyun (2004–07); former South Korean Ambassador and Permanent Representative to the United Nations (2007–09)
 Francesco Paolo Fulci (LL.M.), Italian Diplomat, former Permanent Representative of Italy to the United Nations (1993–99)
 Marvic Mario Victor F. Leonen (LL.M.), Chief Peace Negotiator for the Republic of the Philippines (2010–12)
 Sean Lien (LL.M.), current member of the Central Standing Committee of the Kuomintang, the current ruling party in Taiwan
 Daryl Mundis, senior trial attorney, International Criminal Tribunal for the former Yugoslavia at The Hague
 Jim Peterson (LL.M.), Canadian retired politician, former Minister of International Trade (cabinet) (2003–06), Secretary of State (sub-cabinet) (1997–2007), Member of Parliament in the House of Commons of Canada (1988–2007; 1981–83)
 Lorrin A. Thurston (LL.B.), Kingdom of Hawaii Minister of Interior (1887–90)
 Ronald Duterte (LL.M.), former Mayor of Cebu City, Philippines (1983–86)

Prominent judicial figures
 Salahuddin Ahmad (LL.M. 1970), Attorney General of Bangladesh (2008–09)
 Mark MacGuigan (LL.M., J.S.D.), Attorney General of Canada, also Canadian Minister of Justice (1982–84); Canadian Secretary of State for External Affairs (1980–82)
 Githu Muigai (LL.M. 1986), current Attorney General, Kenya (August 2011–)
 Susan Denham (LL.M.), Chief Justice (2011–), Associate Justice (1992–2011), Supreme Court of Ireland, first female Chief Justice; longest-serving member of court
 George Moe (LL.M.), Chief Justice, Supreme Court of Belize (1982–85); Justice, Eastern Caribbean Supreme Court (1985–91)
 Hironobu Takesaki (LL.M. 1971), 17th Chief Justice of the Supreme Court of Japan (the highest court in the country of Japan) (2008–)
 Umu Hawa Tejan-Jalloh (LL.M.), Chief Justice (2008–), Associate Justice (2002–08), Supreme Court of Sierra Leone
 Giuliano Amato (LL.M.), member, Constitutional Court of Italy (2013–)
 Joaquim Barbosa (visiting scholar, CLS, 1999, 2000), Chief Justice of Brazil (2012–); only black Supreme Federal Court justice minister in Brazil
 Karin Maria Bruzelius (LL.M. 1969), Justice, Supreme Court of Sweden (the highest court in the country of Sweden) (1997–); Swedish Under Secretary of State (the first woman to hold such a position) (1989–97), Swedish Deputy Under Secretary of State (1979–83)
 Jan Schans Christensen (LL.M. 1988), Associate Justice, Supreme Court of Denmark (2013–)
 Lawrence Collins, Baron Collins of Mapesbury (LL.M.), former member, Supreme Court of the United Kingdom (2009–11); Lord of Appeal in Ordinary (2009); Lord Justice of Appeal (2007–09); Judicial Committee of the Privy Council (see the Privy Council) (February 2007–); judge, High Court of England and Wales (2000)
 Jaime Fuster (LL.M. 1966), Associate Justice, Supreme Court of Puerto Rico (the highest court of the island) (1992–2007)
 Marvic Mario Victor F. Leonen (LL.M. 2004), Associate Justice, Supreme Court of the Philippines (the country's highest court) (2012–)
 Liana Fiol Matta (LL.M., S.J.D.), second woman in Puerto Rican history to serve as Associate Justice, Supreme Court of Puerto Rico (as of 2011)
 John T. McDonough (LL.B. 1861), appointed by President Theodore Roosevelt as Associate Justice, Supreme Court of the Philippines (the country's highest court)
 Francis M. Ssekandi (LL.M.), former Justice, Supreme Court of Uganda (the highest court in the country of Uganda); Judge, World Bank Administrative Tribunal (2007–)
 Richard Whitehead Young (LL.B. 1884), appointed by President William McKinley as Associate Justice, Supreme Court of the Philippines; a U.S. Army Brigadier General
 Shi Jiuyong (LL.M. 1951), former President, U.N. International Court of Justice (2003–10); former Chairman, International Law Commission
 Xue Hanqin (LL.M. 1983, J.S.D. 1995), Judge, U.N. International Court of Justice (2010–); Chinese diplomat and international law expert
 V. K. Wellington Koo (Phd. 1912), International Court of Justice (1956–67)
 Charles Evans Hughes, Judge, Permanent Court of International Justice in The Hague, The Netherlands (1928–30)
 Ernest Howard Crosby (LL.B.), Judge in First Instance, Alexandria, Egypt (1887–89)
 Rocky Pollack, Canadian Judge, member of the Manitoba Securities Commission (2002–06)

Academia

University presidents
 Carmen Twillie Ambar (1994), president, Cedar Crest College (2008–present); former head (2002–07) and dean (2007–08), Douglass College (former New Jersey College for Women) (independent college from 1918 to 2007)
 Penelope (Penny) Andrews (LL.M. 1984), Albany Law School's 17th president & dean (effective July 1, 2012–)
 Lee Bollinger (1971), president, University of Michigan (1996–2002); president, Columbia University (2002–present); professor (1973–94) and dean (1987–94), University of Michigan Law School; provost, Dartmouth College (1994–96); Chair, Federal Reserve Bank of New York (2011)
 Colin G. Campbell, 13th president, Wesleyan University
 Colgate Darden (1923), president, College of William and Mary (1946–47); president, University of Virginia (1947–59); namesake of the Darden Graduate School of Business Administration; congressman from Virginia (1933–37, 1939–41); Governor of Virginia (1942–46)
 Ellen V. Futter (1974), president, Barnard College (1980–93); president, American Museum of Natural History
 E. Gordon Gee (1971), president, West Virginia University (1981–85), University of Colorado at Boulder (1985–90), Ohio State University (1990–97), Brown University (1997–2000), Vanderbilt University (2000–07), and Ohio State University (2007–present)
 Frank Johnson Goodnow (1882), first president, Johns Hopkins University
 Samuel Hoi, president, Otis College of Art and Design (2000–)
 Stuart Rabinowitz, eight president, Hofstra University (2000–present), former Hofstra School of Law dean.
 George R. Johnson, Jr. (1976), ninth president, LeMoyne-Owen College
 George Latimer (Minnesota politician), regent, University of Minnesota
 Samuel Laws, president, University of Missouri (1876–89); president, Westminster College, Missouri (1854–61)
 Frank Macchiarola, Chancellor (2008–), president (1996–2008), St. Francis College
 Ronald Mason, Jr. (1977), president, Southern University System (2010–); former president, Jackson State University; President Obama's Board of Advisers on HBCU's
 Barry Mills (1979), president, Bowdoin College (2001–present)
 Emanuel Rackman (1910–2008), Modern Orthodox rabbi; President of Bar-Ilan University
 Mitchell Reiss (J.D.), 27th president of Washington College (2010–)
 Frederick G. Slabach (LL.M.), president, Texas Wesleyan University (January 1, 2011–)
 Michael I. Sovern (1955), president, Columbia University (1980–93); professor (1957–present) and dean (1970–79), Columbia Law School; chairman, Sotheby's (2002–present)
 Hiram F. Stevens (1874), one of the five founders of William Mitchell College of Law
 Ethelbert Dudley Warfield (1885), president, Miami University, Lafayette College, and Wilson College; director, Princeton Theological Seminary.
 Norman Adrian Wiggins (LL.M., S.J.D.), Chancellor and president, Campbell College (subsequently Campbell University) (1967–2003)
 Phillip Williams (1977), president, McNeese State University (2010–); former president, University of Montevallo (2006–10)

Legal academia
 Fionnuala Ní Aoláin (LL.M.), Northern Ireland professor of law, University of Ulster, specializing in human rights law
 Penelope Andrews (LL.M.), dean of Albany Law School; professor of law, South African constitutional law
 Donna Arzt (LL.M.) longtime professor of law, Syracuse University College of Law, human rights law, Director of the Center for Global Law and Practice
 John F. Banzhaf III (1965), professor and practitioner of public interest law, George Washington University School of Law
 Mark Barnes (LL.M.), expert on healthcare law, public health, managed care law, and law and medicine
 Barbara Aronstein Black (1955), first women to head an Ivy League law school; professor and dean, Columbia Law; contracts and legal history
 Lee Bollinger (1971), dean (1987–94), professor (1973–94), University of Michigan Law School; Provost of Dartmouth College (1994–96); President, University of Michigan (1996–02); President, Columbia University (2002–); defendant in the Supreme Court case Grutter v. Bollinger (2003); scholar of First Amendment and freedom of speech
 Lea Brilmayer (LL.M.), Howard M. Holtzmann Professor of International Law, Yale Law School
 Alexandra Carter, clinical law professor, mediator, media personality, negotiation trainer and author
 Alta Charo (1982), professor of Law and Bioethics, University of Wisconsin–Madison; appointments in both Wisconsin's law and medical schools
 Felix S. Cohen (1931), expert on Native American law, legal philosopher; professor, Yale Law School; early proponent of legal realism
 Morris L. Cohen (1951), "one of the nation's most influential legal librarians" and professor of law, University of Pennsylvania, Harvard Law School, Yale Law School
 Lawrence Collins (LL.M.), co-author of standard reference work on conflict of laws (since 1987); author, many other books, articles on private international law; English judge
 Robert Cover (1968), professor, Columbia Law (1971–72) and Yale Law School (1972–86); scholar of history, philosophy, literature, and law
 Brainerd Currie (LL.M.), noted for his work in conflict of laws and for his creation of the concept of governmental interests analysis; dean, University of Pittsburgh School of Law; professor, University of Chicago Law School, Duke Law School; considered the poet laureate of law professors; namesake of annual Brainerd Currie Memorial Lecture
 Eduardo De Los Angeles (1970), dean and professor of law, Ateneo Law School (Philippines); President, Philippine Stock Exchange
 Paul Demaret (LL.M.), Rector, College of Europe (Bruges, Belgium), Director of Legal Studies; former professor, University of Liège
 Donald L. Drakeman, Fellow, Judge Business School, Cambridge University; former faculty member, Princeton University (courses and seminars on U. S. civil liberties)
 Samuel Estreicher (B.A. 1970, J.D. 1975), Dwight D. Opperman Professor of Law, New York University School of Law, director of its Center for Labor and Employment
 Nathan Feinsinger (Law, post-graduate study); expert, labor law; professor, University of Wisconsin Law School, arbitrated a number of national labor disputes
 Robert Isaac Field, expert in many areas of health care law and regulation
 Claire Finkelstein, professor at the University of Pennsylvania Law School
 Edward Foley, theorist of the blue shift and former Ohio Solicitor General
 Marvin E. Frankel (1948), professor, Columbia Law, federal judge, partner at Kramer Levin Naftalis & Frankel (1983–2002)
 Charles Fried (1960), professor, Harvard Law (1961–87, 1989–95, 1999–present), U.S. Solicitor General (1985–89)
 E. Allan Farnsworth (1952), expert on the law of contracts and professor, Columbia Law (1952–2004)
 Michael Geist, Canadian legal academic in internet and E-Commerce law at the University of Ottawa
 Ruth Bader Ginsburg, first women on both Columbia and Harvard Law Reviews; professor, Rutgers School of Law–Newark; first women granted tenure, Columbia Law; co-founded Women's Rights Law Reporter; Associate Justice, United States Supreme Court
 Harvey Goldschmid (1965), professor, Columbia Law and expert on securities law
 Paul Goldstein (1967), professor, Stanford Law School and expert copyright law
 Lino Graglia (1954), professor, University of Texas specializing in antitrust litigation; critic of affirmative action, racial quotas, and some aspects of judicial review; failed nomination, United States Court of Appeals for the Fifth Circuit
 R. Kent Greenawalt (1963), professor, Columbia Law; Fellow, Clare Hall, Cambridge University (1972–73); Fellow, All Souls College, Oxford University (1979); main interests legal philosophy, civil rights; former Deputy Solicitor General of the United States
 Jack Greenberg (1948), dean (1989–93), professor (1984–), Columbia Law; Presidential Citizens Medal; counsel & second President, Director-Counsel, NAACP Legal Defense and Educational Fund (1949–84), in which capacity he argued Brown v. Board of Education (1954); argued  40 civil rights cases before the U.S. Supreme Court
 William Dameron Guthrie, legal educator and lawyer; Storrs Lecturer, Yale University; professor, Columbia Law; author of legal treatises
 James C. Hathaway (LL.M., J.S.D.), legal scholar in the field of international refugee law
 John D. Hawke, Jr. (1969), legal scholar in federal regulation of financial institutions, author of Commentaries on Banking Regulation (1985)
 Alfred Hayes, Jr. (1889), professor, Cornell Law School (1907–17); Progressive Era advocate for Theodore Roosevelt's Progressive Party and the Bull Moose initiative
 Geoffrey C. Hazard, Jr. (1954), Sterling Professor, Emeritus, Yale Law School; Trustee Professor of Law, University of Pennsylvania Law School
 Charles Evans Hughes (1884), professor, Cornell Law School; United States Secretary of State; Associate and Chief Justice, U.S. Supreme Court
 Huger Jervey, was dean (1924–28), Columbia Law (succeeded Harlan Fiske Stone), professor (1923 to 1949)
 Yale Kamisar (1955), expert on criminal law and professor, University of Michigan Law School (1965–present)
 Benjamin Kaplan (1933), Royall Professor of Law, Emeritus, Harvard Law School, copyright scholar and jurist
 Irving Kayton (LL.M., J.S.D.), former professor, George Washington University School of Law, expert on patent and copyright law
 John Marshall Kernochan, law professor; founded Columbia Law's Kernochan Center for Law, Media and the Arts; pioneering work in intellectual property law
 Sanford H. Kadish (1948), influential professor of Criminal Law, University of California, Berkeley
 Marvic Mario Victor F. Leonen (LL.M.), dean (2008–11), law professor, University of the Philippines College of Law
 Howard Lesnick (LLB 1958), Jefferson B. Fordham Professor of Law Emeritus, University of Pennsylvania Law School
Victor Hao Li (J.D. 1964), Professor at Stanford Law School, President of East–West Center (1981–1990)
 Jessica Litman, expert on copyright law, professor, University of Michigan Law School
 Fang Liufang (China Joint PhD Training Program at Columbia Law, February 1989 – September 1990), co-dean, China-EU School of Law
 Louis Lusky (1937), pioneer in field of civil rights law; former professor, Columbia Law
 Gerard E. Lynch (1975), vice dean (1992–97), professor, Columbia Law; primary scholarly interests include criminal law and procedure, sentencing, and professional responsibility; judge, United States Court of Appeals for the Second Circuit (2009–)
 Wendy Mariner, internationally recognized authority in health law, published more than 100 articles in the legal, medical and health policy literature
 Harold Medina (1912), professor, Columbia Law (1912–47); lawyer; judge, federal trial court ('47–51), federal appellate court ('51–80); cover of Time magazine, 1949
 Soia Mentschikoff (1937), drafter, Uniform Commercial Code; first women to teach at Harvard Law School; dean, University of Miami School of Law
 Alan C. Michaels (1986), dean, Ohio State University Moritz College of Law (2008–present)
 Dorothy Miner (1961), helped develop nationwide legal protections for historic landmarks, professor of law
 Richard B. Morris, historian, legal scholar, best known for his pioneering work in colonial American legal history
 Trevor Morrison (1998), dean, New York University School of Law (May 31, 2013–); Associate White House Counsel, President Barack Obama (2009–10)
 Wayne Morse (J.S.D. 1932), dean and professor, University of Oregon School of Law
 Robert Pitofsky, dean, Georgetown University Law Center; professor of law, leading scholar in the area of trade regulation; former Chairman, U.S. Federal Trade Commission
 S. Jay Plager (LL.M. 1961), former dean and professor, Indiana University Maurer School of Law (1977–84)
 Mitchell Reiss (J.D.), Vice-Provost of International Affairs and professor, William and Mary Law School
 Lawrence Sager (1966), dean, University of Texas Law School (2006–present); longtime professor, New York University Law School; visiting professor, Harvard Law School, University of Michigan Law School, Princeton University; one of the nation's preeminent constitutional theorists and scholars
 Rudolf Schlesinger (1942), professor, Cornell Law School, seminal work in comparative law
 Whitney North Seymour (1923), professor, Yale Law School and New York University, Assistant U.S. Solicitor General (1931–33)
 Munroe Smith (1877), pioneering work in comparative jurisprudence, one of the founders of the Political Science Quarterly; dean, School of Mines
 Hans Smit (LL.B. 1958), professor at Columbia Law School, expert on international law
 Michael I. Sovern (1955), dean (1970–79) and professor (1957–present), Columbia Law; President, Columbia University (1980–93); Chairman, Sotheby's (2002–present), scholar of labor law; expert on employment discrimination
 Stewart Sterk, professor, Benjamin N. Cardozo School of Law, leading casebook on trusts and estates
 Hiram F. Stevens (1874), first dean, William Mitchell College of Law; professor, University of Minnesota Law School
 Clyde Wilson Summers (LL.M. 1946, S.J.D. 1952), professor, Yale Law School (1956–75); professor, University of Pennsylvania Law School (1975–05); helped write Labor Management Reporting and Disclosure Act
 Stanley S. Surrey (J.D. 1932), tax law scholar known as "a dean of the academic tax bar" and "the greatest tax scholar of his generation"
 K. A. Taipale (LL.M.), lawyer, scholar, and social theorist specializing in information, technology, and national security policy
 Paul Tappan (J.S.D. 1945), criminologist and Professor of Law and Criminology at the UC Berkeley School of Law
 Arthur T. Vanderbilt, served for many years as the dean of the New York University School of Law, currently housed in a building that bears his name; on two separate occasions he declined to be considered for nominations to the United States Supreme Court; Chief Justice of the New Jersey Supreme Court (1948–57)
 Judith Vladeck (1957), legal scholar, attorney; helped set new legal precedents against sex discrimination and age discrimination
 Charles Warren (1933), legal scholar, Pulitzer prize for History (Supreme Court in United States History)
 Amy Wax (J.D. 1987), Robert Mundheim Professor of Law at the University of Pennsylvania Law School
 Herbert Wechsler (1931), professor, Columbia Law (1933–78); director, American Law Institute (1963–84); argued in U.S. Supreme Court the seminal libel case New York Times v. Sullivan (1964); known for his constitutional law scholarship and creation of the Model Penal Code
 Jack B. Weinstein, professor, Columbia Law (1952–98), author of a leading treatise on evidence; judge, United States District Court for the Eastern District of New York
 Mark D. West (J.D. 1993), dean (2013–) and professor, University of Michigan Law School, widely published on subject of Japanese law and the Japanese legal system
 Louis Westerfield (LL.M. 1980), professor and first African American dean, University of Mississippi School of Law (1994–96)
 Steven Winter, Walter S. Gibbs Professor of Constitutional Law at Wayne State University Law School
 George Winterton (J.S.D.), Professor of Constitutional Law at the University of Sydney, University of New South Wales
 Harold G. Wren (1921–2016), dean of three law schools

Arts and letters
 Charles Warren (U.S. author) (S.J.D.), Pulitzer Prize for History
 John Kendrick Bangs (1883–84), writer and satirist associated with so-called "Bangsian fantasy"
 Alfred Bester (dropped out), science fiction author, TV and radio scriptwriter, magazine editor, Hugo Award
 Charles Chaille-Long (1880), writer, explorer of Africa, soldier
 Da Chen, Chinese author; Brothers awarded best book of 2006 by Publishers Weekly and The Washington Post
 Thomas Frederick Crane, American folklorist, academic at Cornell University, lawyer
 Ernest Howard Crosby, author
 John Watts de Peyster (studied at the Law School), author on the art of war, military history and biography; also published drama, poetry, military criticism
 Bruce Ducker (1964), novelist, Pulitzer Prize nominated, Colorado Book Award
 Freddie Gershon, published author of hugely successful roman à clef concerning the music industry (in the 1960s through the 1980s)
 William Francis Gibbs (LL.B., M.A.), renowned naval architect
 Martin Gottfried, critic, drama critic, columnist and author
 Eddie Hayes (lawyer), memoirist
 Arthur Garfield Hays (1905), author of numerous books and articles
 Isaac Hollister Hall (1865), famed Orientalist and curator of the Metropolitan Museum of Art (1885–96)
 Thomas Hauser (1970), award-winning author; 1991 William Hill Sports Book of the Year; Pulitzer Prize nominated
 William Ivins, Jr. (1907), curator of prints at the Metropolitan Museum of Art (1916–46), author
 Speight Jenkins (1961), arts administrator, general director of the Seattle Opera (1983–)
 Tudor Jenks (1880), author, poet, artist, editor, lawyer
 Caroline Kennedy (1988), writer, editor, author of seven best selling books (including two on civil liberties), attorney; daughter of President John F. Kennedy
 John Marshall Kernochan, law professor, composer, and music publisher
 Gustav Kobbe 1879, music critic and author, best known for his guide to opera, The Complete Opera Book
 Hamilton Wright Mabie (1869), essayist, critic, and lecturer
 Brander Matthews (1873), writer and educator, first U.S. professor of dramatic literature, Legion of Honor
 Brad Meltzer (1996), New York Times best-selling novelist, DC Comics author, and co-creator of the television series Jack & Bobby
 Duffield Osborne (1881), author
 Edward Packard, children's author who developed the "choose your own adventure" style of storytelling
 Isaac Rice (1880), author, inventor, and chess patron
 James N. Rosenberg (1898). artist
 Karenna Gore Schiff (2000), author, journalist, attorney, daughter of Vice-President Al Gore
 Eugene Schuyler (1863), translator of Ivan Turgenev and Leo Tolstoi, writer, scholar
 Paula Sharp, author, translator
 Gerald Tomlinson, writer of mysteries and books on baseball and other topics
 Arthur Dudley Vinton, author and lawyer
 Manly Wade Wellman, writer, recipient of Edgar Allan Poe Award, among other awards
 Daniel R. White (1979), lawyer, humorist, writer, editor; best known as the author of The Official Lawyer's Handbook, a satire of the legal profession, and White's Law Dictionary, a parody of Black's Law Dictionary
 Charles Yu, writer; 2020 National Book Award winner (fiction) for Interior Chinatown, 2007 National Book Foundation "5 Under 35" Award; How to Live Safely, runner up, 2011 Campbell Memorial Award.

Performing arts
 Suchindra Bali, Tamil actor
 Leonard Cohen (1956–57), Canadian singer-songwriter, musician, poet and novelist
 Wafah Dufour (LL.M.), singer/songwriter
 Eric Eisner (1973), lawyer, former president of The Geffen Company and founder of the Young Eisner Scholars program
 Alonzo Elliot, composer and songwriter (studied with Nadia Boulanger and Leonard Bernstein, among others)
 Oscar Hammerstein II², writer, producer, and director of musicals, awarded two Academy Awards, two Pulitzer Prizes, and nine Tony Awards
 Hoyt Hilsman, screenwriter, playwright and critic
 Howard Koch (screenwriter), blacklisted in the 1950s, work includes Casablanca (1942) (for which he received an Academy Award), The War of the Worlds (1936), Letter to an Unknown Woman (1948)
 Robinne Lee, actress, Seven Pounds (2008) with Will Smith, Hav Plenty (1997), among other films
 Rod MacDonald (1973), singer/songwriter
 Abraham Polonsky (1935), Academy Award-nominated screenwriter blacklisted in the 1950s
 Paul Robeson (1923), actor of stage and film, singer (opera, lieder, international folk music, spirituals), and writer; fluent or near fluent in 12 languages
 Tom Rothman (1980), co-chairman and CEO of Fox Filmed Entertainment
 Nick Santora (1996), writer (The Sopranos, Law & Order), producer (Prison Break) and novelist
 Franklin Schaffner (legal education interrupted by service during World War II), Academy Award-winning film director
 Stephen Strimpell, actor of stage and film

Business and philanthropy
 Dan Abrams (1992), general manager of MSNBC; formerly chief legal correspondent for NBC News and host of The Abrams Report
 William Waldorf Astor (1875), Anglo-American financier, son of John Jacob Astor, US Minister to Italy (1881–85)
 Mark Attanasio (1982), investment banker and owner of the Milwaukee Brewers (since 2004, incumbent )
 Roland W. Betts (1978), investor, film producer, lead owner in George W. Bush's Texas Rangers partnership (1989–98), and developer and owner of Chelsea Piers (1989–)
 Douglas Black (1918), president of Doubleday (1946–63)
 Frank Blake (1976), CEO of Home Depot (2007–)
 Bruce Buck (1970), chairman of Chelsea F.C. (2003–)
 Stephen Carlton Clark (1907), Singer Sewing Machine heir, founder of the Baseball Hall of Fame and other Cooperstown, New York cultural institutions
 Alan N. Cohen (1954), chairman, CEO, Madison Square Garden Corp. (1974–77); former principal owner, New Jersey Nets, Boston Celtics, New York Knicks, New York Rangers
 J. Barkclay Collins II (1969), general counsel for Hess Corporation (1984–present)
 Luca Cordero di Montezemolo, President and CEO of Ferrari
 Philippe Dauman (1978), president and CEO of Viacom, parent company of Paramount Pictures and MTV Networks
 Bruce Davis, CEO, chairman, Digimarc; formerly, head of Imagic and Activision; known for his role in development of video game industry
 Lynn Forester de Rothschild, CEO of E L Rothschild (2002–)
 Henry Clay Folger (1881), president of the Standard Oil Company (1911–23) and founder of the Folger Shakespeare Library
 Ted Forstmann (1965), co-founder of Forstmann Little & Company, chairman and CEO of Gulfstream Aerospace (1990–99), and member of Forbes 400 (1998–2003)
 George Griswold Frelinghuysen (1872), president of P. Ballantine & Sons Company
 Stephen Friedman (1962), chairman of Goldman Sachs (1990–94), director of the National Economic Council (2002–05)
 Charles Patrick Garcia, president of Sterling Hispanic Markets Capital Group; White House Fellow, Chairman of the Board of Visitors of the United States Air Force Academy
 Daniel Hunt Gilman (1877), attorney and railroad builder
 Jerome L. Greene (1928), real estate investor and namesake of Columbia's main building, Jerome L. Greene Hall
 Edward S. Harkness (1928)³, Standard Oil Company heir, donated funds used to construct Butler Library at Columbia and most of the undergraduate dormitories at Yale and Harvard, as well as to Phillips Exeter Academy
 Fairfax Harrison (studied law), president, CEO of Southern Railway Company (1913–37)
 David W. Heleniak (1974), vice-chairman of Morgan Stanley
 Morton L. Janklow (1953), literary agent to Sidney Sheldon, Pope John Paul II, Danielle Steel, Ronald Reagan, and J.K. Rowling
 Michael Karlan (1992), founder of the nation's largest social and networking group, Professionals in the City
Mark N. Kaplan (1953), CEO of Drexel Burnham Lambert and Engelhard
 Jerome Kohlberg, Jr. (1950), co-founder of Kohlberg Kravis Roberts, member of the Forbes 400.
 Orin Kramer (1970), chair of the New Jersey Pension Fund
 Stephen M. Kravit, executive vice president, The Gersh Agency, formerly senior vice president, business affairs, Twentieth Century Fox
Harvey M. Krueger (1953), CEO of Kuhn, Loeb & Co. and vice chairman of Lehman Brothers and Barclays
 James T. Lee (1899), prolific Manhattan real estate developer/magnate; grandfather of Jacqueline Kennedy Onassis
 Richard LeFrak (1970), billionaire real estate investor
 H. F. Lenfest (1958), media proprietor and member of Forbes 400 (from 1999)
 Randy Lerner (1987), Chairman and CEO of MBNA (2002–05); owner, Cleveland Browns (2002–) and Aston Villa Football Club (2006–); member of Forbes 400 (since 2002))
Francis Levien (1928), director of Gulf and Western Industries, namesake of Levien Gymnasium
 Russell E. Train (1948), founding trustee, CEO, president, and chairman of the World Wildlife Fund
 Michael Lynne (1964), president (1990–2001), co-CEO and co-chairman (since 2001, incumbent ) of New Line Cinema
 Douglas H. McCorkindale (1964), CEO (since 2000, incumbent ) and chairman (since 2001, incumbent ) of Gannett
 Mark J. Penn, worldwide CEO, public relations firm Burson-Marsteller; president, polling firm Penn, Schoen and Berland Associates
 Tom Pollock,  co-founder of The Montecito Picture Company, former chairman of Universal Pictures
 Steven Price, co-founder of Townsquare Media, and minority owner of the Atlanta Hawks
 Freeman Ransom, general manager of Madame C.J. Walker Manufacturing Company and civic leader
 Bruce Ratner (1970), founder (1985), president, and CEO of Forest City Ratner; principal owner of the New Jersey Nets
 Lawrence R. Riccardi (1965), general counsel of IBM (1995–2002)
 Isaac Rice (1880), founded the Electric Boat Company, renamed itself the General Dynamics Corporation in 1952
 Tom Rogers, president and CEO Tivo; former Chairman and CEO of Primedia Inc.
 Thomas Rothman (1980), co-chair of Fox Filmed Entertainment
 Herb Sandler, founder of Golden West Financial (1963), philanthropist, member of Forbes 400 (from 2003)
 Moose Scheib, founder and CEO of LoanMod.com
 Robert B. Shapiro (1962), CEO of Monsanto Company
 Robert Shaye (1964), founder, chairman/co-chairman and CEO/co-CEO of New Line Cinema (since 1967, incumbent )
 Sid Sheinberg, president and COO of MCA
 James Sherwin (B.A. and J.D.), corporate executive and International Master in chess
 Richard D. Simmons, president of the Washington Post Co. (1981–91)
Herbert M. Singer (1928), director of PepsiCo
 David Stern (1966), commissioner of the National Basketball Association (since 1984, incumbent )
 Audrey Strauss (1982), chief legal officer of Alcoa
 Todd Stitzer (1978), CEO Cadbury plc (incumbent as of 2009)
 Franklin A. Thomas (1963), president of the Ford Foundation (1979–96)
 S. Robson Walton (1969), chairman of Wal-mart (1992, incumbent ) and member of the Forbes 400 (since 1992)
 Mark Weldon (1997), CEO of New Zealand Stock Exchange (2002–12)
 Devin Wenig American business executive, currently the president and CEO of eBay.
 H. Donald Wilson, database pioneer and entrepreneur, first president and one of the principal creators of Lexis and Nexis
 Buchanan Winthrop (1864), American philanthropist and descendant of Wait Winthrop and Joseph Dudley
 Justin Woolverton (2009), co-founder and CEO of Halo Top Creamery

Journalism
 Dan Abrams (1992), media legal commentator
 Poultney Bigelow, journalist and author
 Dean Budnick (1990), journalist, filmmaker and author
 Julius Chambers, F.R.G.S., New York journalist, investigative reporter, author, travel writer
 William Dudley Foulke (1871), journalist, literary critic
 Eddie Hayes, journalist, lawyer
 Tudor Jenks (1880), journalist, editor, lawyer
 Robert Krulwich (1974), media journalist, Alfred I. duPont-Columbia University Award, Emmy Award, George Polk Award
 Henry Demarest Lloyd, referred to as "the father of investigative journalism"
 Cynthia McFadden, ABC news anchor, George Foster Peabody Award
 Matthew Miller (journalist) (1986), also columnist and author, The Two Percent Solution (among other works)
 Victor Robinson, medical journalist and physician
 Karenna Gore Schiff (2000), journalist, author, lawyer
 Alexander Simpson (attended), journalist, attorney
 Cenk Uygur, Creator and Co-host of The Young Turks
 H. Walter Webb, journalist

Private legal practice
 Alan J. Altheimer (1925), managing partner of Altheimer & Gray and former president of the Jewish Council on Urban Affairs
 Paul Drennan Cravath (1886), name partner of New York law firm Cravath, Swaine & Moore (awarded first Municipal Law prize, and prize tutorship).
 William Nelson Cromwell (1878), founder of New York law firm Sullivan & Cromwell.
 George Davidson (1967), head of the Litigation Department of the New York law firm Hughes Hubbard & Reed.
 Gerald Dickler (1933), name partner of Hall, Dickler, Kent, Friedman & Wood and former chairman of Pollock-Krasner Foundation
 Leslie Fagen (1974), litigator; senior partner at the international law firm of Paul, Weiss, Rifkind, Wharton & Garrison.
 Marvin E. Frankel (1948), name partner in New York Law firm Kramer Levin Naftalis & Frankel LLP, litigator, federal judge, professor at Columbia Law, legal scholar.
 William Golub (1937), lawyer and advisor to Governor Nelson Rockefeller
 Arthur Garfield Hays (1905), prominent corporate litigator.
 Ed Hayes (1972), defense attorney and Court TV anchor; basis for the character Tommy Killian in the Tom Wolfe novel The Bonfire of the Vanities.
 Charles Evans Hughes, one of founders of New York law firm Hughes Hubbard & Reed LLP; from 1925 to 1930, he argued over 50 times before U.S. Supreme Court.
 Roberta A. Kaplan (1991), litigator and partner of Paul, Weiss, Rifkind, Wharton & Garrison, argued in United States v. Windsor
Benjamin Kaye (1907), lawyer, playwright, co-founder of Kaye Scholer
 Caroline Kennedy (1988), daughter of President John F. Kennedy; former candidate for U.S. Senator (New York).
 Jeffrey L. Kessler, litigator; partner at the international law firm Winston & Strawn.
Ezra G. Levin (1959), name partner of Kramer Levin Naftalis & Frankel
 Harvey R. Miller (1959), The New York Times called him "the most prominent bankruptcy lawyer in the nation." (March 9, 2007)
 Ira Millstein (1949), antitrust expert, partner at Weil, Gotshal & Manges, longest-practicing partner in big law
 Gary P. Naftalis (1967), co-chairman of New York law firm Kramer Levin Naftalis & Frankel LLP.
 Louis Nizer, noted trial attorney, senior partner of New York law firm Phillips Nizer LLP.
 C. Allen Parker (1983), presiding partner of Cravath, Swaine & Moore.
 Frank Polk (1897), name partner of Davis Polk & Wardwell.
 Charles Rembar (1938), best known as a First Amendment rights lawyer
 Charles F.C. Ruff (1963), Washington attorney who represented Anita Hill and President Bill Clinton.
 Isaac Shapiro (1956), of counsel of Skadden, Arps, Slate, Meagher & Flom, former president of Japan Society
Jonathan D. Schiller (1973), co-founder of Boies Schiller Flexner LLP
 Whitney North Seymour (1923), president of the ABA; chairman of Simpson Thacher & Bartlett.
 Sidney B. Silverman, trial lawyer specializing in stockholder actions.
 John W. Simpson (1873), one of the founders of New York law firm Simpson Thacher & Bartlett.
 David Sive (1948), pioneer in environmental law; founding partner, Sive, Paget & Riesel, PC.
John Slate (1938), name partner of Skadden Arps Slate Meagher & Flom
 John William Sterling (1867), founder of the New York law firm Shearman & Sterling; major donor to his undergraduate alma mater, Yale University; namesake of Yale's library, law building, and its most prestigious endowed chair.
 Francis Lynde Stetson (1869), early leader of New York law firm Davis Polk & Wardwell.
 Max Steuer (1893), one of the most effective American trial attorneys in the first half of the 20th century
 Moses J. Stroock (1888), one of the founders of the law firm Stroock & Stroock
 Sol M. Stroock (1894), one of the founders of the law firm Stroock & Stroock
 Thomas Thacher (1873), one of founders of Simpson, Thacher & Bartlett.
 Henry Waters Taft, one of the most notable lawyers in New York, brother of President William Howard Taft.
 Samuel Untermyer (1878), prominent corporate lawyer and civic leader.
 Frank Weil, Sylvan Gotshal, and Horace Manges, founders of New York law firm Weil, Gotshal & Manges.
 Louis S. Weiss, Simon H. Rifkind, and John F. Wharton, name partners of New York law firm Paul, Weiss, Rifkind, Wharton & Garrison.

Religion
 J. Reuben Clark (1906), leader in the Church of Jesus Christ of Latter-day Saints (LDS Church); member, Quorum of the Twelve Apostles (1934–61)
 Bernard Hebda (1983), Catholic Archbishop of the Archdiocese of Saint Paul and Minneapolis (incumbent as of 2016)
 Charles J. O'Byrne (1984), former Catholic priest

Activism
 Bella Abzug (1947), social rights activist and a leader of the women's rights movement
 Mark Barnes (LL.M. 1991), advocate for public healthcare law at the state and national levels, co-founded the first AIDS law clinic
 Edward Bassett (1886), one of the founding fathers of modern-day urban planning
 Lee Bollinger, advocate for affirmative action, defendant in Grutter v. Bollinger and Gratz v. Bollinger
 Robert L. Carter (1941), civil rights activist, NAACP Legal Defense and Educational Fund general counsel, in which capacity he argued Brown v. Board of Education II (1955)
 Julius L. Chambers (LL.M. 1964), civil rights leader, attorney, and educator; third President and Director-Counsel of the NAACP Legal Defense and Educational Fund
 Felix Cohen (1928), advocate for Native American rights, fundamentally shaped federal Native American law and policy
 Roy Cohn (1947), conservative lawyer who became famous during the investigations of Senator Joseph McCarthy into alleged Communists in the U.S. government
 Robert Cover (1968), civil rights and international anti-violence activist, professor at Yale Law School
 Albert DeSilver (1913), a founding member of the American Civil Liberties Union (ACLU)
 Edward Ennis (1932), chairman of the ACLU from 1969 to 1976
 William Dudley Foulke (1871), reformer, one of the principal reformers, New York State and the federal civil service systems; early president, American Suffrage Association
 Marvin Frankel (1949), founder, Lawyers Committee for Human Rights, served as its chairman for many years; also helped establish sentencing guidelines for the federal courts
 Ruth Bader Ginsburg, women's rights advocate, co-founded the Women's Rights Law Reporter; co-authored the first law school casebook on sex discrimination; as chief litigator of the ACLU's women's rights project, she argued six(?) cases before the U.S. Supreme Court
 Richard Gottfried, leading advocate for patient autonomy and for universal access to quality, affordable health care
 Jack Greenberg (B.A. 1945, LL.B. 1948), second President and Director-Counsel of the NAACP Legal Defense and Educational Fund; argued 40 civil rights cases before the U.S. Supreme Court, including Brown v. Board of Education (1954)
 Arthur Garfield Hays (1905), civil liberties activist, general counsel for the ACLU, notable trials included Scopes Trial, trial of Sacco and Vanzetti, and Scottsboro case
 Charles Evans Hughes, one of the co-founders of the National Conference of Christians and Jews to oppose the Ku Klux Klan, anti-Catholicism, and anti-Semitism
 Arundhati Katju (LL.M. 2017), has litigated many notable cases at the Supreme Court of India and the Delhi High Court, including the Section 377 case, which overturned Section 377, a colonial-era sodomy law in India which was used to criminalize homosexuality.
 Caroline Kennedy (1988), principal fund raiser of private funds for the New York City public schools, co-founder of Profiles in Courage Award, a director of the Commission on Presidential Debates and the NAACP Legal Defense and Educational Fund, one of three co-chairs of President-elect Barack Obama's Vice Presidential Search Committee (2008), adviser to the Harvard Institute of Politics
 John Marshall Kernochan, advocate for artists' intellectual property rights
 William Kunstler (1948), civil rights and human rights activist, director of the American Civil Liberties Union (ACLU) (1964–72); co-founded the Center for Constitutional Rights
 John Brooks Leavitt (1871), reformer, author
 Peter Lehner, lawyer and environmentalist; Executive Director, Natural Resources Defense Council
 Charles K. Lexow, first attorney for the Legal Aid Society of New York City; brother of Clarence Lexow (class of 1872)
 Li Lu (1996), leader of the Tiananmen Square Protests (1989), first student at Columbia to simultaneously receive B.A., M.B.A., and J.D. degrees
 Louis Marshall (1876–77), mediator and Jewish community leader who worked to secure religious, political, and cultural freedom for all minority groups; conservationist
 Vilma Socorro Martínez, served for almost ten years as president and general counsel of Mexican American Legal Defense and Educational Fund
 James Meredith (1968), American civil rights movement figure, first African American student at the University of Mississippi
 Constance Baker Motley (1946), attorney for the NAACP Legal Defense and Educational Fund (1945–64); Manhattan Borough president (1964–66); first African American woman appointed to the federal bench (1966–86)
 Nancy Northup, President of the Center for Reproductive Rights
 Marshall Perlin (1942), civil liberties lawyer, defended Soviet spies Julius and Ethel Rosenberg
 Anika Rahman (1990), president and CEO, Ms. Foundation for Women (2/2011)
 Paul Rapoport (1965), co-founder of the New York City Lesbian, Gay, Bisexual and Transgender Community Services Center and the Gay Men's Health Crisis
 Michael Ratner (1969), human rights activist on national and international level, current president of the Center for Constitutional Rights (co-founded by William Kunstler in 1969), the National Law Journal named him as one of the 100 most influential lawyers in the United States (2006)
 Isaac Rice, U.S. chess patron
 Paul Robeson (1923), civil and human rights activist, international social justice activist, writer, Spingarn Medal
 Menachem Z. Rosensaft (1979), a leader of the Second Generation Movement of children of Jewish survivors
 Brad R. Roth (LL.M. 1992), social and human rights activist, critic of torture policies in the administration of George W. Bush
 Charles Ruthenberg (1909), founder of the Communist Party of America (1919)
 Mikheil Saakashvili (LL.M. 1994), founder and leader of the United National Movement in Georgia (country), leader of the bloodless "Rose Revolution"
 Theodore Shaw, civil rights leader, attorney, and educator; former 5th President and Director-Counsel, NAACP Legal Defense and Educational Fund
 Clive Stafford Smith, British lawyer; recipient Gandhi International Peace Award (2005) for representing Guantanamo detainees and campaigning against extraordinary rendition
 Cenk Uygur, activist, creator of online progressive network and host of The Young Turks, founder of Wolf-PAC and Justice Democrats
 Judith Vladeck (1947), civil rights advocate, particularly on behalf of women; helped set new legal precedents against sex discrimination and age discrimination
 Charles Weltner (1950), advocate for racial equality, second individual to receive the John F. Kennedy Profile in Courage Award
Maya Wiley (born 1964), civil rights activist and lawyer, 2021 mayoral candidate for New York City

Athletics

 Mario Ančić (LL.M. 2013), former Croatian professional tennis player
 Mark Attanasio (1982), investment banker and owner of the Milwaukee Brewers (since 2004, incumbent )
 Lou Bender (1935), pioneer player with the Columbia Lions and in early pro basketball, who was later a successful trial attorney.
 Moe Berg (1930), catcher for the Brooklyn Robins (1923), Chicago White Sox (1926–30), Cleveland Indians (1931, 1934), Washington Senators (1932–34) and Boston Red Sox (1935–39); able to speak 12 languages; spy for the OSS; according to Casey Stengel, "the strangest man ever to play Major League Baseball"
 David Mark Berger (1970), winner of NCAA weightlifting title in the 148 pound-class, winner of the gold medal in the middleweight weight-lifting contest at the 1969 Maccabiah Games, winner of a silver medal at the 1971 Asian Games in weightlifting, and member of the 1972 Israeli Olympic team who was murdered during the Munich Massacre at the 1972 Munich Summer Olympics.
 Roland W. Betts (1978), investor, film producer, lead owner in George W. Bush's Texas Rangers partnership (1989–98), and developer and owner of Chelsea Piers (since 1989, incumbent )
 Nick Bravin (1998), Olympic fencer
 Alan N. Cohen (1954), chairman and CEO of the Madison Square Garden Corporation (1974–77), principal owner of the New Jersey Nets, and principal owner of the Boston Celtics (1983–2004)
 Caryn Davies (Class of 2013), American rower; gold medals, 2012 Summer Olympics and 2008 Summer Olympics; silver medal, 2004 Summer Olympics
 Leo Fishel (1900), former pitcher in Major League Baseball
 Stan Kasten (1976), President (2003–) of the MLB Washington Nationals; President (1986–2003) of the MLB Atlanta Braves; President (1986–2003) and General Manager (1979–90) of the NBA Atlanta Hawks; President (1999–2003) of the NHL Atlanta Thrashers
 Walter O'Malley (transferred from), owned the Brooklyn/Los Angeles Dodgers team in Major League Baseball from 1950 to 1979
 Paul Robeson (1923), All-American Athlete
 David Stern (1966), NBA Commissioner (1984–2014)
 Marc Stern (1969), part-owner of the Milwaukee Brewers
 John Montgomery Ward (1883), played baseball for the Providence Greys (1878–82), New York Giants (1883–89, 1893–94), Brooklyn's Ward Wonders (1890) and Brooklyn Grooms (1890–91); president of the Boston Braves (1911–12); advocate for player's rights; member of the Baseball Hall of Fame (1964)
 Mark Weldon (1997), member of the New Zealand men's swim team at the 1992 Summer Olympics in Barcelona; CEO, New Zealand Stock Exchange; in 2007, rated 25th on New Zealand Listener Power List of the 50 most powerful people in New Zealand

Notes
¹ Studied law at Columbia University prior to the founding of the Law School.

² Failed to complete the law degree.

³ Received the LL.D.

References

Columbia Law School
Alumni, Law school
Lists of people by university or college in New York City